Chinattus is a genus of jumping spiders that was first described by D. V. Logunov in 1999. The name is a combination of "China" and -attus, a common suffix for salticid genera.

Species
 it contains seventeen species, most occurring in China and nearby countries, with C. caucasicus reaching into Iran, and C. parvulus in North America:
Chinattus caucasicus Logunov, 1999 – Caucasus, Iran
Chinattus chichila Logunov, 2003 – Nepal
Chinattus dactyloides (Xie, Peng & Kim, 1993) – China, Japan
Chinattus emeiensis (Peng & Xie, 1995) – China
Chinattus falco Suguro, 2016 – Japan
Chinattus furcatus (Xie, Peng & Kim, 1993) – China, Japan
Chinattus ogatai Suguro, 2014 – Japan
Chinattus parvulus (Banks, 1895) – USA, Canada
Chinattus sinensis (Prószyński, 1992) – China
Chinattus szechwanensis (Prószyński, 1992) – China
Chinattus taiwanensis Bao & Peng, 2002 – Taiwan
Chinattus tibialis (Zabka, 1985) – China, Vietnam
Chinattus undulatus (Song & Chai, 1992) (type) – China
Chinattus validus (Xie, Peng & Kim, 1993) – China, Nepal, Bhutan
Chinattus wengnanensis Cao & Li, 2016 – China
Chinattus wulingensis (Peng & Xie, 1995) – China
Chinattus wulingoides (Peng & Xie, 1995) – China

References

Salticidae
Salticidae genera
Spiders of Asia
Spiders of North America